Pame or PAME may refer to:

 All-Workers Militant Front (PAME), a coordination centre within the Greek trade union movement
 Armstrong Pame, politician
 Nosferatu pame, a fish
 Pame language
 Pame people
 Primary amoebic meningoencephalitis
 Protection of the Arctic Marine Environment